Lukáš Endál (born December 8, 1986) is a Czech professional ice hockey forward who currently plays for Ciarko PBS Bank KH Sanok of the PHL in Poland. He formerly played for HC Pardubice and HC Slavia Praha of the Czech Extraliga, and Piráti Chomutov and HC Havlíčkův Brod of the  1. národní hokejová liga.

References

External links

1986 births
Living people
Piráti Chomutov players
Czech ice hockey forwards
Motor České Budějovice players
HC Dynamo Pardubice players
KH Sanok players
HC Tábor players
BK Havlíčkův Brod players
HC Slavia Praha players
Sportspeople from Havlíčkův Brod
Czech expatriate ice hockey people
Expatriate ice hockey players in  Poland
Czech expatriate sportspeople in Poland